Haslingden High School is a secondary school located in Haslingden, Rossendale, England. The school receives children from many local primary schools, one of the largest being Helmshore Primary School.

History
The two schools in Haslingden that preceded the school were Haslingden Grammar School on Bury Road, which was knocked down in 1997, and turned into a housing development, and Haslingden County Secondary School on Ryefield Avenue.

Performance
In the most recent inspection by Ofsted, the main school was awarded "Good" in all criteria. The sixth form was also graded as "Outstanding" for care, advice and guidance. Exam results have risen for the last five years, with increasing results in ICT, English Literature, Religious Studies and BTEC Sport.

GCSE results are often above the English national average. It is notable for being one of the few Lancashire comprehensive schools with a sixth form college.

Admissions
The school is led by headteacher Russel Clarke. It runs a faculty system, each headed by a curriculum leader. The pastoral system at Haslingden High School includes heads of lower, middle and upper schools leading learning mentors in each year group.

The sixth form is led by Ms Lauren Marsland, Director of Sixth Form Studies. The Sixth Form at Haslingden is part of the main school and many of the high school students go on to complete Post-16 study at Haslingden's sixth form. Students have also joined from other local schools such as Bacup and Rawtenstall Grammar School, All Saints Catholic Language College in Rawtenstall, Fearns Community Sports College in Bacup and Alder Grange Community and Technology School in Rawtenstall.

Notable former pupils
 Sam Aston, actor who plays Chesney Brown on Coronation Street
 Antony Higginbotham, Conservative MP for Burnley 
 Connie Hyde, British actress
Keira Walsh, England International and Manchester City footballer

Haslingden Grammar School
 Sir Rhodes Boyson, Conservative MP for Brent North from 1974 to 1997
 Prof Tom Constantine, Professor of Civil Engineering from 1967 to 1981 at the University of Salford
 Dame Sharon Hollows
 Philip Robinson, Vice Chancellor of the University of Chichester from 1996 to 2007

References

External links
 EduBase
 OFSTED Report in PDF format.

Secondary schools in Lancashire

Schools in the Borough of Rossendale
Community schools in Lancashire